Begins Here is the debut full-length album by Brisbane rock band The Butterfly Effect. Begins Here reached number 23 on the ARIA Album Charts, the band's first entry to the top 100, as their first extended play The Butterfly Effect had peaked outside of the top 100.

The album features two tracks that made the Triple J Hottest 100 voted by Triple J listeners. "One Second of Insanity" came 68th in the 2003 Hottest 100 and "Always" came 99th in the 2004 Hottest 100. Some copies of Begins Here were released with the "Always" single as a bonus disc.

The music style of "Begins Here" is a transition in sound between their EP and "Imago" with the EP having an alternative metal sound and "Imago" employing a more progressive rock feel. "Begins Here" contains most of the heaviest material TBE has done so far. After nearly three years of release, in mid-2006 "Begins Here" was certified gold in Australia, with sales in excess of 35,000 copies.

Flynn Gower, the vocalist of Australian progressive rock band Cog, makes a guest appearance on the song "Perception Twin".

Track listing

Personnel

Band
 Clint Boge  – lead vocals
 Kurt Goedhart  – lead guitar
 Glenn Esmond  – bass guitar
 Ben Hall  – drums

Charts

Certifications

References 

The Butterfly Effect (band) albums
2003 debut albums